AIDS-defining clinical conditions (also known as AIDS-defining illnesses or AIDS-defining diseases) is the list of diseases published by the Centers for Disease Control and Prevention (CDC) that are associated with AIDS and used worldwide as a guideline for AIDS diagnosis. CDC exclusively uses the term AIDS-defining clinical conditions, but the other terms remain in common use.

This list governs the US government's classification of HIV disease. This is to allow the government to handle epidemic statistics and define who receives US government assistance. However, considerable variation exists in the relative risk of death following different AIDS-defining clinical conditions.

Definition

According to the CDC definition, a patient has AIDS if they are infected with HIV and have either:
 a CD4+ T-cell count below 200 cells/µL
 a CD4+ T-cell percentage of total lymphocytes of less than 14%
 or one of the defining illnesses.

A patient presenting one of the above conditions but with laboratory evidence against HIV infection is not normally considered to have AIDS, but an AIDS diagnosis may be given if the patient has had Pneumocystis jirovecii pneumonia, and has not:
 undergone high-dose corticoid therapy or other immunosuppressive/cytotoxic therapy in the three months before the onset of the indicator disease
 been diagnosed with Hodgkin's disease, non-Hodgkin's lymphoma, lymphocytic leukemia, multiple myeloma, or any cancer of lymphoreticular or histiocytic tissue, or angioimmunoblastic lymphoadenopathy
 or been diagnosed with a genetic immunodeficiency syndrome atypical of HIV infection, such as one involving hypogammaglobulinemia.

Defining illnesses

2008 definition
Are the following:
 Candidiasis of bronchi, trachea, or lungs
 Candidiasis esophageal
 Coccidioidomycosis, disseminated or extrapulmonary
 Cryptococcosis, extrapulmonary
 Cryptosporidiosis, chronic intestinal for longer than 1 month
 Cytomegalovirus disease (other than liver, spleen or lymph nodes)
 Cytomegalovirus retinitis (with loss of vision)
 Encephalopathy (HIV-related)
 Herpes simplex: chronic ulcer(s) (for more than 1 month); or bronchitis, pneumonitis, or esophagitis
 Histoplasmosis, disseminated or extrapulmonary
 Isosporiasis, chronic intestinal (for more than 1 month)
 Kaposi's sarcoma
 Lymphoma, Burkitt's
 Lymphoma, immunoblastic (or equivalent term)
 Lymphoma, primary, of brain
 Mycobacterium avium complex or Mycobacterium kansasii, disseminated or extrapulmonary
 Mycobacterium, other species, disseminated or extrapulmonary
 Mycobacterium tuberculosis, any site (extrapulmonary)
 Pneumocystis jirovecii pneumonia (formerly Pneumocystis carinii)
 Progressive multifocal leukoencephalopathy
 Salmonella sepsis (recurrent)
 Toxoplasmosis of the brain
 Tuberculosis, disseminated
 Wasting syndrome due to HIV

Added in 1993
 Cervical cancer (invasive)
 Mycobacterium tuberculosis, any site (pulmonary)
 Pneumonia (recurrent)

Children < 13 years
Additional conditions are included for children younger than 13:
 Bacterial infections, multiple or recurrent
 Lymphoid interstitial pneumonia or pulmonary lymphoid hyperplasia complex

History
In 1993, the CDC added pulmonary tuberculosis, recurrent pneumonia and invasive cervical cancer to the list of clinical conditions in the AIDS surveillance case definition published in 1987 and expanded the AIDS surveillance case definition to include all HIV-infected persons with CD4+ T-lymphocyte counts of fewer than 200 cells/μL or a CD4+ percentage of less than 14. Outside the US, however, diagnosis with a listed opportunistic infection is still required.

It has been suggested that other conditions (such as penicilliosis) should be included in other countries.

References

External links
 
 

HIV/AIDS